The 1960 CCCF Championship was played in Havana, Cuba from 14 February to 29 February. Costa Rica emerged as champion.

Final standings

Results

Playoff

References

1960-61
Cccf Championship, 1960
International association football competitions hosted by Cuba
CCCF
1960 in Central American sport
1960 in Cuban sport
Sports competitions in Havana
February 1960 sports events in North America
1960s in Havana

it:Campionato centroamericano e caraibico di calcio 1957